Skýcov is a municipality (village) in the Zlaté Moravce District, Nitra Region, Slovakia. It is located between the towns of Partizánske and Zlaté Moravce, in the Tribeč mountains.

References

External links
Official homepage

Villages and municipalities in Zlaté Moravce District